Linda Eder (born February 3, 1961) is an American singer and actress. She made her Broadway debut in the musical Jekyll & Hyde, originating the role of Lucy Harris, for which she was nominated for the Drama Desk Award. Eder has performed in concert halls across the country including Carnegie Hall and Radio City Musical Hall. She has released her 18th solo album in 2018.

Biography

Eder was born in Tucson, Arizona, on February 3, 1961, and raised in Brainerd, Minnesota. Her parents,  Georg (from Austria) and Laila (from Norway), exposed her to music at an early age. She cites Judy Garland, Barbra Streisand, and Eileen Farrell as her childhood inspiration. Eder cites Garland, specifically, as her greatest influence. Her first musical theater credit was as the Mother Abbess in a high school production The Sound of Music. Eder was 4th runner up in the 1980 Miss Minnesota Pageant.

Before her work on Broadway, Eder sang in clubs in Minneapolis and performed at Harrah's Casino in Atlantic City, New Jersey. In 1988 she won the talent show Star Search, where her performance caught the notice of Frank Wildhorn. She signed with RCA Records and starred in two 1991 stagings of Wildhorn's musical Svengali (the 1990 world premiere and 1995–96 national tour), the 1997 Broadway production of his Jekyll & Hyde, and the 2003 World Premiere of Camille Claudel. During those years, Eder recorded several CDs on Angel Records and Atlantic Records.  Wildhorn and Eder married in 1998  and divorced in 2004; they have one son, Jake. Eder won the Theater World Award (1996–97) for Best Broadway Debut in Jekyll & Hyde.

After her first solo concert at New York's famous Carnegie Hall she caught the attention of two talk show hosts who were in the audience that night: Rosie O'Donnell and Kathie Lee Gifford. She subsequently appeared on The Rosie O'Donnell Show and Live with Regis and Kathie Lee and the Late Show with David Letterman. She was invited to Gifford's final performance on Live... and sang the song "Anything Can Happen", which was written for the musical Wonderland: Alice's New Musical Adventure,

Broadway
Eder's major theatrical career began in 1987, when she auditioned in Florida in front of musical theater composer Frank Wildhorn for the leading role of Lucy in Jekyll & Hyde. Very impressed with her vocal skills, she was immediately cast, although no production was planned at that time.  Linda has also performed holiday concerts on Broadway at The Palace and Gershwin theaters.

Jekyll & Hyde
In 1990, the Alley Theatre in Houston agreed to host the world premiere of Jekyll & Hyde, the first musical ever performed there. The show was extended several times, and Eder received raves for her performance. Following this triumph, Wildhorn debuted the musical Svengali, starring his two leading performers from Jekyll: Linda and Chuck Wagner. The musical also eventually played at the Asolo Theatre in Sarasota, Florida in 1991. She then performed with several workshops for The Scarlet Pimpernel, as the leading lady Marguerite St. Just, as well as appearing on the concept recording.

In 1995, after several workshops with Jekyll & Hyde, she was once again Lucy; Robert Cuccioli and Christiane Noll starred opposite her. The show remounted at the Theatre Under the Stars in Houston, before moving to Seattle's 5th Avenue Theatre. Following these two successful runs, Eder's headlining stint as Lucy traveled across the nation from Fall 1995 until Spring 1996, with a hopeful Broadway mounting in Spring 1996. However, the show was delayed.

Finally beginning previews the following March 1997, new creative team members joined. Along with the transfer came the dismissal of Lucy's first big number, "Bring on the Men". Although several rumors have circulated as to why it was cut, Eder has said that it was director/choreographer/scenic designer Robin Phillips who cut the song, which was not only one of her favorite songs, but a fan favorite as well. She has, however, given him some praise, mostly due to the acting coaching he gave her.

In 1997, she was nominated for the Drama Desk Award and Outer Critics Circle Award and won the Theatre World Award for her debut performance. Television personalities such as Regis Philbin and Rosie O'Donnell considered Eder robbed of a Tony Award nomination, both of whom had featured her (and Frank Wildhorn and his other musicals) on their respective shows several times. Eder was married to Wildhorn whilst performing on Broadway, and officially left on August 30, 1998. Luba Mason replaced her.  Eder left Jekyll to start a family but agreed to be cast in the limited run of the world premiere of Wildhorn's musical tapestry, The Civil War for its Houston premiere.

Eder performed for several workshops and demo recordings for Wildhorn. Most importantly, she did several tracks for his Wonderland: Alice's New Musical Adventure (previously called Alice), which had its world premiere ten years after the first single ("Anything Can Happen") was released, Havana (for which she has released the title song and several others), Bonnie & Clyde: A New Musical (which was to recently star Brandi Burkhardt, but now Laura Osnes, having its world premiere in 2009), Dracula, the Musical as Mina, Cyrano de Bergerac - The musical as Roxanne (opposite Douglas Sills in the title role), and finally Camille Claudel, which was written for her, and she was able to perform at two runs.

Eder's next musical outing was in Camille Claudel in 2003. She performed the role at the Goodspeed Opera House. Although the show, presented in an entire chamber-style form, received mixed reviews, Eder gained much attention again. In 2004, it was performed at the New York Musical Theatre Festival. However, the show has yet to be produced on a major scale, although several European productions were planned and an eventual Japanese premiere in 2011.

The Other Side of Me

Released on September 30, 2008, her CD The Other Side of Me has a pop/country feel. This is a departure from the style she is known for, which is standards and ballads. Her official website has a posting where Eder says "It took a year and a half to make my new CD, the other side of me, but in reality, it has been a lifetime in the making."

She goes on to say:

Now
At a "Frank Wildhorn & Friends" concert in Vienna in 2010, Eder appeared with Wildhorn, and European musical theatre superstars Pia Douwes and Thomas Borchert to celebrate the music of Wildhorn. The two shared a song, "Living in the Shadows." Eder performed several numbers including "Vienna", a fitting ending to the concert.  A live audio recording was released of the concert, but a planned DVD release was put on hold.

In 2011, Eder reunited with former record producer and musical arranger Jeremy Roberts and Wildhorn to work on two pieces. First, on the musical Tears of Heaven, which was produced in South Korea.

Also in 2011, Eder debuted her first Wildhorn-composed solo album since 2003, entitled Now. The recording received much acclaim and featured the single "Now" as well as a blend of pop songs and musical selections, such as "The Mad Hatter" (from Wonderland), "What's Never Been Done Before" (Camille Claudel), and "Living in the Shadows" (Victor/Victoria), which was originally written for Julie Andrews in the Broadway production of that musical.

In 2013 Eder recorded her 15th solo CD, a holiday themed album called Christmas Where You Are, which features a duet with her son Jake, then 14 years old. She adapted the lyrics to make it a personal and humorous mother and son duet.

She is becoming increasingly sought after for her successful Master Classes and vocal lessons.

Her concert schedule continues to take her across the country. In 2013 she performed a series of concerts entitled Memory Lane, incorporating key songs from her earliest performing days to the present.

Linda Live - The Live Concert Recording
On June 21, 2014, Eder performed a concert at the Arthur Zankel Music Center on the campus of Skidmore College.  This performance was recorded and will become Eder's  15th solo album. The concert was performed to a crowd of nearly 500 people and contained Eder's signature songs which include, "Someone Like You" from Jekyll & Hyde, "Vienna" and "Man of La Mancha."  Other songs performed that evening were all songs Eder said she performed throughout her career, including "I'm Not Lisa," "I Dreamed a Dream" from Les Miserables, "Fernando" (by ABBA), "Don’t Cry for Me Argentina" from Evita and "Climb Ev’ry Mountain" from the only musical Eder said she performed in high school, The Sound of Music.  Linda Live was released on September 9, 2014 and is sold exclusively on Eder's website.

Personal life  

Linda Eder married Frank Wildhorn on May 3, 1998. They have a son, Jake, born in 1999. They separated in fall 2003 and divorced in 2004.

Notable Theatre Roles

Discography

Solo albums
 1989 Vienna (Early UK release of the Linda Eder album)
 1991 Linda Eder
 1994 And So Much More
 1997 It's Time
 1999 It's No Secret Anymore
 2000 Christmas Stays the Same
 2002 Gold
 2003 Storybook
 2003 Broadway, My Way
 2005 By Myself: The Songs of Judy Garland
 2007 Greatest Hits
 2008 The Other Side of Me
 2009 Soundtrack
 2011 Now
 2013 Christmas Where You Are
 2014 Linda Live: The Concert Recording
 2015 Retro
 2018 If You See Me
 2020 Retro-Volume Two

Musical albums
 1990 Jekyll & Hyde: Romantic Highlights (Concept Album) - Lucy Harris & Lisa Carew
 1992 The Scarlet Pimpernel (Concept Recording) - Marguerite St. Just
 1995 Jekyll & Hyde: The Complete Work (Concept Album) - Lucy Harris
 1997 Jekyll & Hyde - The Musical: Original Broadway Cast - Lucy Harris
 1998 The Scarlet Pimpernel: Encore! (Second Broadway Cast) - Marguerite St. Just ("Only Love", "You Are My Home")
 1998 The Civil War: An American Musical (Concept Album)
 1998 The Civil War: The Nashville Sessions
 2003 Camille Claudel: A New Musical (Studio Demo Recording)* - Camille Claudel
 2004 Cyrano de Bergerac ~ The Musical (Concept Album)* - Roxanne
 2005 Peter Pan (Leonard Bernstein) World Premiere Recording of the complete Bernstein score - Wendy
 2010 Halleluiah Broadway - Herself ("What I Did For Love" (from A Chorus Line), "Electricity" (from Billy Elliot))
 2011 Tears of Heaven (Concept Album)

*- Although planned, final outcome was that it was not to be released.

Singles
"A Little Bit of Heaven"
"Something To Believe In"
"Vienna"
"Never Dance"
"The Christmas Song"
"Bells of St. Paul" (Christmas)
"Gold" (From Camille Claudel)
"I Am What I Am" (From La Cage Aux Folles)
"Lifted"
"The Other Side Of Me"

Video albums
 1999 In Concert  (Aired on PBS) 
 2001 Christmas Stays The Same  (Aired on Bravo) 
 2018 The Other Side: An Inside Look At My Life With Out The Audience

Awards

References

External links
 The Official Linda Eder Site

1961 births
Living people
American women pop singers
American people of Norwegian descent
People from Brainerd, Minnesota
American people of Austrian descent
American musical theatre actresses
Actresses from Minnesota
Singers from Minnesota
20th-century American actresses
21st-century American actresses
20th-century American singers
21st-century American singers
20th-century American women singers
21st-century American women singers
Theatre World Award winners